Althouse may refer to:

Adelbert Althouse (1869–1954), American naval officer and Governor of Guam
Ann Althouse, American law professor and blogger
Paul Shearer Althouse (1889–1954), American opera singer
Vic Althouse (born 1937), Canadian politician
John G. Althouse Middle School